Chilecito is a city in the Argentine province of La Rioja, and head of the department of Chilecito.

Overview
The city is located in the valley formed by the Sierras de Velazco to the east, and the Sierras de Famatina to the west. The city was founded in 1715 by Spanish colonizers. Chilecito still preserves the cable-car of La Mejicana mine built by Bleichert which is part of the city mining past that saw its peak at the end of the 19th century.

Chilecito is surrounded by an oasis of irrigation, which has been expanded by way of supplements from underground waters. A great part of agricultural land is used for the cultivation of vineyards because the most significant industrial activity is based in wine-cellars. Walnut and fruit trees are also cultivated and their product is locally processed.

The Argentine educator, lawyer, senator, governor and historian Joaquín V. González was raised in the vicinity of Chilecito. He also used to spend his vacation in a home that he built here in his later years. The property, which he called Samay Huasi (Quechua 
Samay Wasi, "rest house") was donated to the University of La Plata for use as an artists' retreat.

By the end of the 1990s, the university of Chilecito which was still part of the National University of La Rioja became the National University of Chilecito. This decision was highly criticized by different academic and political sectors, especially those concerning to the President of Argentina at the time, Carlos Menem.

Population

According to statistics, Chilecito had 49,453 inhabitants (data taken from the ) which represents a 31% population increase in ten years (there were 22,485 inhabitants in 1991). These numbers include the nearby localities of Anguinán, Los Sarmientos, San Miguel and La Puntilla; without them, the population of Chilecito in 2001 was 25,423 inhabitants.

Climate

Remarkable people
 Juan Ramires de Velasco
 Joaquín V. González, née Joaquín Víctor González
 Mateo Rosas de Oquendo
 Julián Amatte
 Doña Nocenta Pizetta
 Francisco Antonio Ortiz de Ocampo
 Domingo de Castro y Bazán
 Sarmiento de la Vega
 Isabel Ibarra y Velasco de Sarmiento de la Vega
 Arturo Marasso
 Gabino Coria Peñaloza

References

Populated places in La Rioja Province, Argentina
Populated places established in 1715
1715 establishments in the Spanish Empire
Cities in Argentina
La Rioja Province, Argentina